Andrew Graham Beshear (born November 29, 1977) is an American attorney and politician who has served as the 63rd governor of Kentucky since 2019. A member of the Democratic Party, he is the son of Steve Beshear, the 61st governor of Kentucky. Beshear served from 2016 to 2019 as the 50th Attorney General of Kentucky.

Beshear was elected attorney general of Kentucky in November 2015 and took office in January 2016. As attorney general, he sued Governor Matt Bevin several times over issues such as pensions. He then defeated Bevin by just over 5,000 votes in the 2019 gubernatorial election. As of 2022, Beshear and Lieutenant Governor Jacqueline Coleman are Kentucky's only Democratic statewide elected officials.

Early life and education
Beshear was born in Louisville, the son of Steve and Jane (Klingner) Beshear. He graduated from Henry Clay High School in Lexington, Kentucky. His father, a lawyer and politician, was the governor of Kentucky from 2007 to 2015.

Beshear attended Vanderbilt University in Tennessee, where he was a member of the Sigma Chi Fraternity and graduated in 2000 with a bachelor's degree in anthropology. He then attended the University of Virginia School of Law, where he received a Juris Doctor in 2003.

Legal career
In 2005, Beshear was hired by the law firm Stites & Harbison, at which his father was a partner. He represented the developers of the Bluegrass Pipeline, which would have transported natural gas liquid through Kentucky. The project was controversial; critics voiced environmental concerns and objections to the use of eminent domain for the pipeline. His father's office maintained that there was no conflict of interest with the son's representation. Beshear also represented the Indian company UFLEX, which sought $20 million in tax breaks from his father's administration, drawing criticism from ethics watchdogs over a potential conflict of interest.

Kentucky Attorney General

Elections

2015 

In November 2013, Beshear announced his candidacy in the 2015 election for Attorney General of Kentucky, to succeed Democrat Jack Conway, who could not run for reelection, due to term limits.

Beshear defeated Republican Whitney Westerfield with 50.1% of the vote to Westerfield's 49.9%. The margin was approximately 2,000 votes.

Tenure

Beshear sued Governor Matt Bevin several times over what he argued was Bevin's abuse of executive powers during Beshear's tenure as attorney general and while he was campaigning against Bevin for governor. Beshear won some cases and lost others. In April 2016, he sued Bevin over his mid-cycle budget cuts to the state university system. The Kentucky Supreme Court issued a 5–2 ruling agreeing with Beshear that Bevin did not have the authority to make mid-cycle budget cuts without the Kentucky General Assembly's approval. Also in 2016, the Kentucky Supreme Court unanimously sided with Bevin when Beshear sued him on the grounds that Bevin lacked the authority to overhaul the University of Louisville's board of trustees. In 2017, the Kentucky Supreme Court threw out a lawsuit Beshear brought against Bevin, holding that Bevin had the power to temporarily reshape boards while the legislature is out of session; Bevin called Beshear's lawsuit a "shameful waste of taxpayer resources". In April 2018, Beshear successfully sued Bevin for signing Senate Bill 151, a controversial plan to reform teacher pensions, with the Kentucky Supreme Court ruling the bill unconstitutional. Bevin said Beshear "never sues on behalf of the people of Kentucky. He does it on behalf of his own political career".

Throughout October 2019, Beshear filed nine lawsuits against pharmaceutical companies for their alleged involvement in fueling Kentucky's opioid epidemic.

Beshear forwent a run for a second term as attorney general to run for governor against Bevin. He resigned from the attorney general's office on December 10, 2019, to be sworn in as governor. He was succeeded as attorney general by Daniel Cameron on December 17.

Governor of Kentucky

Elections

2019 

On July 9, 2018, Beshear declared his candidacy for the Democratic nomination for governor of Kentucky in the 2019 election. His running mate was Jacqueline Coleman, a nonprofit president, assistant principal, and former state house candidate. Beshear said he would make public education a priority. In May 2019, he won the Democratic nomination with 37.9% of the vote in a three-way contest.

Beshear faced incumbent Governor Matt Bevin, the nation's least popular governor, in the November 5 general election. He defeated Bevin with 49.20% of the vote to Bevin's 48.83%. It was the closest Kentucky gubernatorial election ever by percentage, and the closest race of the 2019 gubernatorial election cycle.

Days later, Bevin had not yet conceded the race, claiming large-scale voting "irregularities" but not offering evidence. Kentucky Secretary of State Alison Lundergan Grimes's office nevertheless declared Beshear the winner. On November 14, Bevin conceded the election after a recanvass was performed at his request that resulted in just a single change, an additional vote for a write-in candidate.

Beshear defeated Bevin largely by winning the state's two most populous counties, Jefferson and Fayette (respectively home to Louisville and Lexington), by an overwhelming margin, taking over 65% of the vote in each. He also narrowly carried the historically heavily Republican suburban counties of Campbell and Kenton in Northern Kentucky, as well as several historically Democratic rural counties in Eastern Kentucky that had swung heavily Republican in recent elections.

2023 

On October 1, 2021, Beshear declared his candidacy for reelection as governor in the 2023 election.

Tenure 

Beshear was inaugurated as governor on December 10, 2019. In his inaugural address, he called on Republicans, who had a supermajority in both houses of the Kentucky General Assembly, to reach across the aisle and solve Kentucky's issues in a bipartisan way.

Upon taking office, Beshear replaced all 11 members of the Kentucky Board of Education before the end of their two-year terms. The firing of the board members fulfilled a campaign pledge, and was an unprecedented use of the governor's power to reorganize state boards while the legislature was not in session. Beshear's critics suggested that the appointments undermined the Kentucky Education Reform Act of 1990, which sought to insulate the board from political influence; the Board had increasingly been the focus of political battles in the years preceding 2019.

On December 12, 2019, Beshear signed an executive order restoring voting rights to 180,315 Kentuckians, who he said were disproportionately African-American, who had been convicted of nonviolent felonies.

In April 2020, Beshear ordered Kentucky state troopers to record the license plate numbers of churchgoers who violated the state's COVID-19 stay-at-home order to attend in-person Easter Sunday church services. The order led to contentious debate.

In June 2020, Beshear promised to provide free health care to all African-American residents of Kentucky who need it, in an attempt to resolve health care inequities that came to light during the COVID-19 pandemic.

On November 18, 2020, as the state's COVID-19 cases continued to increase, Beshear ordered Kentucky's public and private schools to halt in-person learning on November 23, with in-person classes to resume in January 2021. This marked the first time Beshear ordered, rather than recommended, schools to cease in-person instruction. Danville Christian Academy, joined by Attorney General Daniel Cameron, filed a lawsuit in the United States District Court for the Eastern District of Kentucky, claiming that Beshear's order violated the First Amendment by prohibiting religious organizations to educate children in accordance with their faith. A group of Republican U.S. senators supported the challenge. The U.S. Court of Appeals for the Sixth Circuit and the U.S. Supreme Court upheld Beshear's order.

In March 2021, Beshear vetoed all or part of 27 bills that the Kentucky legislature had passed. The legislature overrode his vetoes.

Beshear's tenure in office has been marked by several natural disasters. In December 2021, Beshear led the emergency response to a tornado outbreak in western Kentucky, which devastated the town of Mayfield and killed more than 70 people, making it the deadliest in the state's history. In July 2022, torrential rain caused severe flooding across Kentucky's  Appalachia region and led to the deaths of over 25 people; Beshear worked with the federal government to coordinate search and rescue missions as President Biden declared a federal disaster to direct relief money to the state.

Political positions
Beshear is a Democrat. With an overwhelmingly Republican Kentucky legislature, Stephen Voss, a political scientist at the University of Kentucky, observed: "The Republicans have a supermajority. If they can remain unified, they don't have to play ball with this governor at all."

Abortion
Beshear supports access to abortion and Roe v. Wade. One month after he took office as governor, his administration gave Planned Parenthood permission to provide abortions at its Louisville clinic, making it the second facility in Kentucky to offer abortions. In April 2020, Beshear vetoed a bill that would have allowed Attorney General Daniel Cameron to suspend abortions during the COVID-19 pandemic and exercise more power regulating clinics that offer abortions. He was endorsed by NARAL Pro-Choice America, an abortion rights group, and is supported by Planned Parenthood.

In 2021, Beshear allowed a born-alive bill to become law without his signature, requiring doctors to provide medical care for any infant born alive, including those born alive thanks to a failed abortion procedure.

COVID-19

On March 25, 2020, Beshear declared a state of emergency over the COVID-19 pandemic. He encouraged business owners to require customers to wear face coverings while indoors. He also banned "mass gatherings" including protests but not normal gatherings at shopping malls and libraries; constitutional law professor Floyd Abrams and lawyer John Langford opined that Beshear's order was inappropriate as it violated public protests' special protected status under the First Amendment.

In August 2020, Beshear signed an executive order releasing inmates from prisons and jails in an effort to slow the virus's spread. The Kentucky Department of information and Technology Services Research and Statistics found that over 48% of the 1,704 inmates released committed a crime within a year of their release and that a third of those were felonies.

Beshear was criticized for not calling the Kentucky General Assembly into a special session (a power only the governor has) in order to work with state representatives to better address the needs of their constituents during the pandemic. In November 2020, the Kentucky Supreme Court upheld the constitutionality of Beshear's emergency executive orders. In late November 2020, Beshear imposed new restrictions to further slow the spread of COVID-19, including closing all indoor service for restaurants and bars, restricting in-person learning at schools, limiting occupancy at gyms, and limiting social gatherings. House Speaker David Osborne and Senate President Robert Stivers criticized Beshear for failing to consult the legislature before making his decisions.

Beshear's targeted closures were criticized after it was discovered that state and local authorities were unable to establish contact tracing as it relates to certain types of businesses listed in his restrictions. On June 11, 2021—one day after the Kentucky Supreme Court heard oral argument on the emergency powers issue—Beshear lifted most of Kentucky's COVID-19 restrictions. In August 2021, amid an upsurge in cases driven by the Delta variant, Beshear mandated that face masks be worn in public schools.

On August 19, 2021, U.S. District Judge William Bertelsman issued a temporary restraining order blocking the school mask mandate. Two days later, the Kentucky Supreme Court ruled against Beshear's challenge of several newly enacted Kentucky laws that, among other things, limit the governor's authority to issue executive orders in times of emergency to 30 days, unless extended by state legislators. The state supreme court dissolved an injunction against the law issued by a Kentucky trial court at Beshear's request. The Supreme Court's opinion, by Justice Lawrence VanMeter, addressed separation of powers between the governor and the General Assembly. The Kentucky Supreme Court found that the challenged laws were valid exercises of the General Assembly's legislative powers, although two justices wrote in a concurring opinion that the 30-day "kill switch" enacted by the legislature should be scrutinized on remand to the lower courts. On August 23, 2021, Beshear rescinded his executive order requiring masks in Kentucky schools.

Crime
Beshear signed an executive order completely restoring the voting rights, and right to hold public office, of 180,315 Kentuckians who had been convicted of nonviolent felonies. He has restored rights to more felons than any other governor in American history.

In 2020, Beshear signed an executive order releasing 1,704 inmates from prisons and jails in an effort to slow COVID-19's spread.

In 2020, Kentucky's violent crime rate was its highest since 2008, aggravated assaults were the highest since 2000, and homicides were the highest since 1995. In March 2021, Beshear signed a law that allows judges to decide whether to transfer minors 14 and older to adult court if they are charged with a crime involving a firearm. Previously, judges were required to send juveniles to adult court to be prosecuted for a felony if a firearm was involved.

Also in March 2021, after the Kentucky legislature passed a bill to make it a crime to cause $500 or more damage to a rental property, Beshear vetoed the bill. The Kentucky House (74-18) and Senate (28-8) overrode his veto.

Drugs
Beshear said that a significant driver of incarceration in Kentucky is the drug epidemic, and opined that Kentucky "must reduce the overall size of our incarcerated population... We don’t have more criminals. We just put more people in our prisons and jails."

Beshear is of the view that possession of marijuana should never result in incarceration.  He would also like to see medical marijuana legalized. In November 2022, Beshear signed an executive order to allow medical marijuana possession and to regulate delta-8.

Economic policy

In 2019, Beshear pledged to bring more advanced manufacturing jobs and health care jobs to Kentucky, to offset job losses due to the decline of coal.

Beshear opposes the Kentucky right-to-work law.

After the Kentucky legislature voted to allow Kentucky distilleries and breweries to qualify for a sales tax break on new equipment, Beshear vetoed the provision. In April 2020, the Kentucky legislature overrode the veto.

In June 2021, Beshear signed an executive order to allow name, image, and likeness compensation to be received by college athletes. It made Kentucky the first state to do so via executive order; six other states had done so through their legislatures.

Education
In 2019, Beshear pledged to include a $2,000 pay raise for all Kentucky teachers in his budgets (at what he estimated would be a cost of $84 million). Republican House Majority Floor Leader John Carney rejected the proposal. Beshear has proposed such a pay raise in his budgets, but the Kentucky legislature has not included such raises in the budgets it passed.

Beshear is opposed to all charter schools in Kentucky, saying "schools run by corporations are not public schools." He says that funding them would violate the state constitution.

Environment
Beshear believes the scientific consensus on climate change. In 2019, he said he wanted to create more clean energy jobs to employ those who lose their jobs in the coal industry and to expand clean coal technology in Kentucky.

Gambling
Beshear supports legalizing casino gambling, sports betting, fantasy sports betting, and online poker betting in Kentucky.

Beshear proclaimed March 2020 Responsible Gambling Awareness Month in Kentucky.

Gun rights
Beshear said he would not support an assault weapons ban. He said he would instead support a red flag law authorizing courts to allow police to temporarily confiscate firearms from people a judge deemed a danger to themselves or others.

Health care
Beshear supports Kentucky's Medicaid expansion, which provides affordable health care to over 500,000 Kentuckians, including anyone with a preexisting condition. He criticized Bevin for trying to roll back the state's Medicaid expansion (which ultimately failed). As attorney general and governor, Beshear expressed support for the Affordable Care Act and criticized efforts to strike the law down in the courts. On October 5, 2020, he announced the relaunch and expansion of kynect, the state health insurance marketplace that was started in 2013 during Steve Beshear's term as governor and dismantled by Bevin in 2017.

Immigration
In December 2019, Beshear told President Donald Trump's administration that he planned to have Kentucky continue to accept refugees under the U.S. immigration program. Trump had told state governments that they had the power to opt out of the U.S. refugee resettlement program.

Infrastructure
Beshear supports a $2.5 billion project to build a companion bridge to supplement the Brent Spence Bridge that carries Interstates 71 and 75 over the Ohio River between Covington, Kentucky, and Cincinnati, Ohio. He hoped to fund the bridge by conventional means, not tolling, but was unsure whether the state in fact had the funds to do that. In 2021, Kentucky Senator Chris McDaniel, Northern Kentucky's top Republican state lawmaker and chair of the Senate finance and budget committee, said he opposed Beshear's proposal to use the state's rainy day fund or a general fund surplus to help pay for the project.

In August 2019, Beshear promised to construct the Interstate 69 Ohio River Bridge between Henderson, Kentucky, and Evansville, Indiana, by 2023, saying, "we will build that I-69 bridge in my first term as governor." The project would cost $914 million (plus financing and interest costs). He said he believed the project would provide economic benefits to Western Kentucky.

LGBT issues
Beshear supports legal same-sex marriage. He also supports nondiscrimination laws that include gay, lesbian, bisexual, and transgender people. He was the first sitting governor of Kentucky to attend an LGBTQ-rights rally, and posed for a picture with drag queens. He supported a ban on the practice of conversion therapy for LGBTQ youth.

Pensions
Beshear wants to fund the state's pension system, which has accumulated $24 billion in debt since 2000, the most of any state in the country. He opposed pension cuts made by Bevin, and said he wants to guarantee all workers pensions when they retire. As of June 30, 2020, the Kentucky State Pension Fund was at 58.8% of its obligations for the coming decades.

Personal life 
Beshear and his wife Britainy are members of the Christian Church (Disciples of Christ) and both are deacons. They have two children.

Electoral history
2015 Kentucky Attorney General Democratic primaryBeshear ran uncontested.

2015 Kentucky Attorney General election

2019 Kentucky Gubernatorial Democratic primary

2019 Kentucky Gubernatorial election

References

Sources

External links 

 Official website of Governor Andy Beshear
 Beshear/Coleman campaign website
 

|-

|-

|-

|-

|-

|-

 

1977 births
21st-century American politicians
Democratic Party governors of Kentucky
Kentucky Attorneys General
Kentucky lawyers
Living people
Politicians from Louisville, Kentucky
University of Virginia School of Law alumni
Vanderbilt University alumni
American Disciples of Christ
Candidates in the 2019 United States elections